Will Jones (January 23, 1889 – February 19, 1972) was an American racecar driver who drove in the Indianapolis 500. He was born in Milwaukee, Wisconsin, and died, aged 83, in Zephyrhills, Florida.

Indy 500 results

References

Indy 500

1889 births
1972 deaths
Indianapolis 500 drivers
Racing drivers from Milwaukee
Racing drivers from Wisconsin
Sportspeople from Milwaukee